Lupinus microcarpus, the wide-bannered lupine or chick lupine, is a species of lupine native to western North America from southwestern British Columbia south through Oregon and California, including the Mojave Desert, and into Baja California.  There is also a disjunct population in South America, with locations in central Chile and western Argentina.

Description
The leaves are palmately compound with 5-11 leaflets – long and up to  broad.

The flowers are generally pink to purple in color, but can also be between white and yellow; they are produced in open whorls on an erect spike.

Varieties
There are three named botanical varieties:
Lupinus microcarpus var. densiflorus - whitewhorl lupine or dense-flowered lupine. Endemic and restricted to western California (formerly Lupinus densiflorus).
Lupinus microcarpus var. horizontalis. Endemic and restricted to southeastern California deserts.
Lupinus microcarpus var. microcarpus. Widespread, British Columbia to Chile.

Phytoremediation waste management
Chilean scientists (Universidad de Santiago de Chile) studying phytoremediation waste management in the city of Antofagasta, discovered that plants are capable of absorbing arsenic from the soil.

References

Mojave Desert Wildflowers, Jon Mark Stewart, 1998, pg. 137
Chilean Scientists use the plant for wastes' Phytoremediation clean-up management of soils.

External links

 Jepson Manual treatment for  Lupinus microcarpus
U.C. Photo gallery

microcarpus
Flora of British Columbia
Flora of the West Coast of the United States
Flora of Washington (state)
Flora of Oregon
Flora of California
Flora of Baja California
Flora of Argentina
Flora of Chile
Flora of the California desert regions
Flora of the Sierra Nevada (United States)
Garden plants of North America
Garden plants of South America
Phytoremediation plants
Flora without expected TNC conservation status